(English: Federal Police: The Law Is for Everyone) is a Brazilian thriller movie of 2017. It was directed by Marcelo Antunez, produced by Tomislav Blazic and scripted by Thomas Stavros and Gustavo Lipsztein. It was inspired by the book of the same name by Carlos Graieb and Ana Maria Santos. Starring Antônio Calloni, portrays Operation Car Wash from the point of view of the police investigators who acted in it. According to producer Tomislav Blazic, the plot will be divided into three films, which should be released each year, and the film is not a documentary and therefore, despite being based on the Lava Jato, has no obligation to be faithful to the reality.

Costing 16 million reais, the film did not have the sponsors revealed, and did not use public resources. The names of the investors, about 25, were kept confidential, according to Blazic, at the request of the entrepreneurs, who made the disbursements as individuals. "They asked, I have to respect. Many films were made like this in Brazil and abroad." The film featured a cooperation agreement signed between Blazic and the Federal Police in 2015. The film had its premiere on August 28 for guests in Curitiba, among them judges Sérgio Moro, Marcelo Bretas and prosecutor Deltan Dallagnol, as well as delegates, police and justice officials, and premiered in Brazilian theaters at Independence Day holiday, September 7.

In the first week, it attracted 461,783 to the theaters, about 430,000 from Thursday to Sunday, and another 30,000 in the premieres, with revenues of 7.8 million reais, being the second most watched movie behind the US movie It. It had the best debut of the year among national films. As of September 25, the number of people who went to the cinema to watch the movie surpassed one million, and by the end of the first day of October became the most viewed national movie of 2017 until then.

Production
Producer Tomislav Blazic was working on another film with the Federal Police on the arms and drug trafficking project when Operation Car Wash began to emerge. Seeing the size of what was happening to the country, he decided to stop this other project and get behind the scenes of Operation Car Wash so that society would be aware of the evil that corruption brings to everyone.

The film took a year and a half for research, screenplay and filming and was supported by the Brazilian Federal Police itself, which advised the production, gave interviews to the director and screenwriters, and authorized the filming of scenes at its headquarters in Curitiba and the Rio de Janeiro.

Cast 

 Antonio Calloni as Ivan
 Bruce Gomlevsky as Júlio Cesar
 Flávia Alessandra as Beatriz
 Rainer Cadete as ítalo Agneli
 João Baldasserini as Vinícius
 Ary Fontoura as Luiz Inácio Lula da Silva
 Marcelo Serrado as Sérgio Moro
 Roberto Birindelli as Alberto Youssef
 Juliana Schalch as Rosângela Moro
 Eduardo Melo as Filipo Moro
 Samuel Toledo as Agent Edu
 Leonardo Medeiros as Marcelo Odebrecht
 Roney Facchini as Paulo Roberto Costa
 Sandra Coreveloni as Dona Marici
 Juliana Schalch as Reporter Juliana
 Genesio de Barros as Julio Cesar's father
 Adelio Lima as Dr. Antenor
 Tadeu Aguiar as Director Geral Rodrigo
 Cris Flores as Lilian
 João Lucas Romero as Walter
 Yaçana Martins as Julio Cesar's mother
 Alex Rechi as Julio Cesar's brother
 Beth Zalcman as Dona Mariza
 Bruno Giordiano as Moraes
 Sefora Rangel as Senator
 Joca Andreazza as Parliamentary
 Dani Antunez as Isabella Odebrecht
 Lumi Kin as Nelma Kodama
 Marcelo Panazi as Renato Duque
 Charles Myara as Pedro Barusco
 Paulo Tavares as Cerveró
 Geise Lima as Catta Preta
 Isadora Ceccato as Paulo Roberto Costa's daughter
 Angela Delphin as Paulo Roberto Costa's maid
 Alexandre Luzzi as Euvis
 Paulo Cesar as Old executive
 Angela Pataro as Old executive's wife
 Ricco Lima as Glasses's executive 
 Antõnio Barboza as Thin executive
 Rocine Castelo as Bald executive
 Alexandre Massulo as fat executive
 Laura Haddad as Red jakcet's lawyer
 Sidy Correa as grey necktie's lawyer
 Fabio Bastos as IML's medic
 Marcelo Torreão as Maradona
 Reporters - superintendency of pf's (curitiba)
 Adriano Gomes
 Nicole Castoldi
 Caio Torrado
 Julia Cartier Bresson as Global coast's reporter
 Reporters - Lula building
 Daniel Chagas
 Carol Picchi
 Gero Pestalozzi as Anchorman
 Mariana da Costa Pinto as Anchorwoman
 Reporters - Solaris condominium
 Guilherme Gonzalez
 Lu Baptista
 Vivi Netto
 Aline Carrocino as Solaris condominium' maid
 Ole Erdmann as Swiss district attorney
 Maurício Fernandes as Lula's lawyer
 Jaedson Bahia as Lula's safety
 Osvaldo Fernandes as Presenter
 Rodrigo Leite as Reporter - conference room
 Daniel Moragas as delegate of the federal police of brasilia
 Ed Canedo as london agent
 Rafael Zolly as Brasilia's agent
 Marcelo Mello as RJ agent (Rico)
 Robson Santos as Agent A
 Fábio Nascimento as Rosangela Moro living room's agent
 Tian Drese as Coercive agent
 André Kirmayr as gpi agent
 Mário Toba as Federal's japanese
 Bia Barros as Ivan's daughter
 Sofia Barros as Vini's daughter
 Leticia Tomazela as Vini's wife

Criticism and compliments
According to Humberto Trezzi of Zero Hora newspaper, the film has some sins. On-screen prosecutors and federal police officers interact harmoniously, when their relationship is often seen as tense and antagonistic at the time of conducting award-winning allegations. The director chose to give real names to politicians and businessmen (Lula, former president of the republic, appears only through a grouchy and obnoxious representation), but gave the police officers pseudonyms. The critic questions this artistic decision of different treatment. Even to circumvent the accusation of Manichaeism, some character delegates say that they voted for the PT and debated the Car Wash (as has happened, in fact, in any Brazilian family). If the film charges against petistas at this first moment, the sequels should attack the "tucanos" (supporters of PSDB) and the "peemedebistas" (supporters of PMDB).

According to Katia Kreutz of the Cinemascope website, Ruy Barbosa's phrase, which opens the film, could also be used for its conclusion. “From seeing the triumph of nullities triumphing, from seeing dishonor thrive, from seeing injustice grow, from seeing the powers rise in the hands of the wicked, man discourages virtue, laughs at honor, to be ashamed to be honest. ”When the lights come on, some of the audience may even laugh, some already expecting the continuations of this story - which promises to be long… Others will simply get up from their seats ashamed to live in a country where they live. law is not yet in fact for everyone.

According to Artur Xexéo of the newspaper O Globo, “Polícia Federal” is a good guy and bad guy movie that starts from the premise that the good guy is the Federal Police and the bad guy, the Workers Party. If this bothers you, do not go near the door of the movie theaters where it is playing. If you accept this role distribution, if only for expecting from the movie just a piece of fiction, then go without fright. “Federal Police” is quite a thriller and has worked as a catharsis for viewers who seem outraged by recent news.

See also 

Erika Marena
Federal Police of Brazil
Operation Car Wash
Thomas Stavros

References

External links
 
  - official trailer

Brazilian thriller films